Rallarvegen is a construction/access road in central Norway that is now popular as a recreation trail for bicyclists.  It was built from 1902 to 1904 in connection with the construction of the Bergen Line. The road is maintained by the Norwegian National Rail Administration as an access road for the railroad.  

The road runs from Haugastøl Station in the municipality of Hol in Viken county to Finse Station in Ulvik municipality in Vestland county. It continues across the mountains to Myrdal Station in Aurland municipality in Sogn og Fjordane county, and then there is a fork in the road. One path goes north through the Flåmsdalen valley to the village of Flåm on the shore of the Sognefjorden and the other path heads west through the Raundalen valley to Vossevangen.

The road is named after the "rallar" or navvies, the railway construction workers and "vegen" means road, so the name literally means the "navvy road".

The road is now a popular bicycle road. Every year, in the short season from July to September, over 20,000 cyclists travel the route. It is unpaved, and maintained by the railroad with period materials.

Media gallery

References

External links
 

Cycleways in Norway
Tourist attractions in Norway
Aurland
Hol
Ulvik